All My Rowdy Friends can refer to one of three songs by Hank Williams, Jr.:

"All My Rowdy Friends (Have Settled Down)" (1981), from the album The Pressure is On
"All My Rowdy Friends Are Coming Over Tonight" (1984), from the album Major Moves
"All My Rowdy Friends Are Here on Monday Night" (1989), an adaptation of the 1984 song, theme for Monday Night Football broadcasts